Malcolm Lyon may refer to:

 Dar Lyon (Malcolm Douglas Lyon, 1898–1964), English cricketer
 Malcolm Lyon (diplomat) (1930–2007), Australian public servant and diplomat